The women's 100 metre breaststroke event at the 2000 Summer Olympics took place on 17–18 September at the Sydney International Aquatic Centre in Sydney, Australia.

At only 16 years of age, U.S. swimmer Megan Quann fulfilled her merciless prediction by knocking off South Africa's defending Olympic champion Penny Heyns in the event. Coming from third at the final turn, she surged powerfully past the champion over the last 25 metres to snatch the gold medal in a new American record of 1:07.05, just a small fraction closer to an Olympic standard. Australia's overwhelming favorite Leisel Jones, who just turned 15, roared back from fifth place on the final stretch to take home the silver in 1:07.49. Heyns, who was struggling with her form in the prelims and semifinals, seized off a strong lead under a world-record pace (31.10), but ended up only with a bronze in a time of 1:07.55. Meanwhile, Sarah Poewe, the fastest qualifier for the final, trailed behind her teammate by three-tenths of a second in 1:07.85.

Outside the 1:08-club, Hungary's Ágnes Kovács finished fifth in 1:08.09, and was followed in sixth by Japan's Masami Tanaka with a time of 1:08.37. Aussie favorite Tarnee White (1:09.09) and 31-year-old Sylvia Gerasch (1:09.86), a product of the old East German system, closed out the field.

Notable swimmers missed out the top 8 final, featuring Quann's teammate Staciana Stitts, who had a poor start on the morning prelims with an eighteenth-place effort; and Angola's Nádia Cruz, the first for her nation to compete in all four editions of the Games since 1988.

Records
Prior to this competition, the existing world and Olympic records were as follows.

Results

Heats

Semifinals

Semifinal 1

Semifinal 2

Final

References

External links
Official Olympic Report

B
2000 in women's swimming
Women's events at the 2000 Summer Olympics